Too Many Cooks is a surreal black comedy short that originally aired as a special during Adult Swim's "infomercials" block on October 28, 2014, at 4:00 am Eastern Time.  It was created, written, and directed by Casper Kelly, and produced by Williams Street. After its original airing, the piece became a viral video online and was repeated each night at midnight Eastern Time during the week of November 11, 2014.

Premise
The short begins as a parody of opening credits sequences of 1970s, 80s, and 90s American sitcoms, then television crime dramas, prime time soap operas, Saturday morning cartoons, superhero live-action series, slasher films, and science fiction television shows, with each of them gradually bleeding into the next. Particular focus is put on a slasher film villain (played by William Tokarsky), who is hidden in the background of several early shots but eventually starts killing the other characters with a machete. The opening credits sequence ends after about ten minutes and transitions into the "episode", with all the characters from the opening standing in the one house; the short ends roughly ten seconds later, cutting to closing credits before a full line of dialogue ("Honey, I'm ho-") can be spoken.

Development and production
According to Kelly, he conveyed the concept of the short to his Squidbillies writer-producer friend Jim Fortier, who in turn described it to Adult Swim executive Mike Lazzo, who loved the idea. The footage was filmed over a period of three days in October 2013 with a cast completely composed of extras from the Atlanta area. Post-production took a year, with Kelly recruiting friends and co-workers to help with the process.

While the video depicts the opening credits of a fictional television show, most of the cast members' real names were used. According to Katie Adkins, actors were not presented with a clearly explained script, but rather coached on the go, in a somewhat nonchalant manner.

Among the series openings parodied are those of Full House, Wonder Woman,  The Brady Bunch, Dallas, Dynasty, Battlestar Galactica, Falcon Crest, ALF, G.I. JOE, Roseanne, Family Matters, T. J. Hooker, Seinfeld, and the Law & Order franchise.  The short briefly mentions avant-garde film director Lars von Trier.

Reception
Upon its release by a third party on YouTube, Too Many Cooks became a viral video, with Rolling Stone calling it an "instant cult classic". Director Rian Johnson said that, "no joke", Too Many Cooks should have been nominated for an Academy Award for Best Live Action Short Film (although it was in fact ineligible for this honour, not having had a cinematic release). Comedians including Penn Jillette, Simon Pegg, Zach Braff, and Richard Kelly tweeted their positive reactions to Too Many Cooks.

David Sims of The Atlantic wrote that Too Many Cooks relied on "the classic anti-comedy premise of taking so long with something that it goes from being funny, to being not very funny, to being boring, to suddenly becoming hilarious again. More than that, it's an excellent piece of non-narrative sketch comedy that sets out boundaries for its own weird reality and then goes about breaking them over and over again." Dr. Julian Darius called it "a sublime postmodern masterpiece" and analyzed its metafictional aspects.

In 2022, Rolling Stone ranked it the 10th-best TV theme song of all time, calling it an "earworm" that is "somehow every theme song, from every genre".

Legacy
CNN created a parody of the video in March 2015, using it to mock the number of potential candidates in the 2016 United States Presidential Election. The video was conceived by digital producer Eric Weisbrod; Chris Moody, a senior digital correspondent at CNN and the video’s creative director, noted that "b-roll from cheesy political ads...are almost taken right out of '90s sitcoms. If you look at old ads, it’s families smiling at each other and smiling at the camera. It just fit so nicely."

In June 2018, Adult Swim published a short film by Casper Kelly and Nick Gibbons titled Final Deployment 4: Queen Battle Walkthrough, which parodies livestreaming gaming culture. Kelly described this short as his spiritual successor to Too Many Cooks.

References

External links

 

2014 television specials
Adult Swim pilots and specials
American drama short films
Black comedy television shows
Cannibalism in fiction
Metafictional television series
Film and television opening sequences
Parodies of television shows
Viral videos
American black comedy films
Television shows filmed in Atlanta